Atreides may refer to:

 Descendants of Greek mythical figure Atreus, especially:
 Agamemnon
 Menelaus
 House Atreides, a fictional noble family in Frank Herbert's Dune universe
Alia Atreides
Ghanima Atreides
Leto II Atreides
Paul Atreides
 Atreides (album), a 1980 album by Yannis Zouganelis